Hansa-Brandenburg W.34 was a prototype German two-seat, single-engined floatplane, which had been designed by Hansa und Brandenburgische Flugzeugwerke during World War I.

Development
The W.34 was similar in design to the W.33, but was powered by a Basse und Selve BuS.IVa six-cylinder water-cooled engine. The first prototype flew in 1918, shortly before the Armistice. The other two prototypes were operated by the Finnish Navy following the Versailles Treaty and used for coastal defence, being re-engined with Fiat A.12bis engines.

Specifications (W.34)

See also

References

Bibliography

1910s German military reconnaissance aircraft
W.34
Floatplanes
Single-engined tractor aircraft
Low-wing aircraft
Aircraft first flown in 1918